The eighth season of the television series Dallas aired on CBS during the 1984–85 TV season.

Cast

Starring
In alphabetical order:
 Patrick Duffy as Bobby Ewing (30 episodes)
 Linda Gray as Sue Ellen Ewing (30 episodes)
 Larry Hagman as J.R. Ewing (30 episodes)
 Susan Howard as Donna Culver Krebbs (29 episodes)
 Steve Kanaly as Ray Krebbs (30 episodes)
 Howard Keel as Clayton Farlow (26 episodes)
 Ken Kercheval as Cliff Barnes (30 episodes)
 Priscilla Beaulieu Presley as Jenna Wade (29 episodes)
 Victoria Principal as Pamela Barnes Ewing (30 episodes)
 Donna Reed as Miss Ellie Ewing Farlow (24 episodes), billed under "Also Starring" status for her first episode
 Charlene Tilton as Lucy Ewing Cooper (30 episodes)

Also Starring
 Jenilee Harrison as Jamie Ewing Barnes (27 episodes)
 Deborah Shelton as Mandy Winger (27 episodes)
 Morgan Brittany as Katherine Wentworth (5 episodes), billed under "Special Guest Star" status for her final episode
 Dack Rambo as Jack Ewing (5 episodes)
 Leigh McCloskey as Mitch Cooper (4 episodes)
 Jared Martin as Steven "Dusty" Farlow (2 episodes)
 Audrey Landers as Afton Cooper (1 episode)

Special Guest Stars
 Stephen Elliott as Scotty Demarest (11 episodes)
 Daniel Pilon as Naldo Marchetta (7 episodes)

Notable guest stars
In addition to several guest actors continuing to appear on the show, Burke Byrnes (Pete Adams) is added to the cast, and William Smithers (Jeremy Wendell) returns after a two-year absence. Sarah Cunningham also returns after four years, as Cliff and Pam's aunt, Maggie Monohan. Additionally Fredric Lehne (Eddie Cronin) and Kathleen York (Betty) appear in a major story-arc, although neither of them will return for subsequent seasons.

Crew 
Showrunner Leonard Katzman, Arthur Bernard Lewis and David Paulsen remain the core writers, although Peter Dunne, in preparation for taking over showrunning duties during the following season, writes two episodes in place of Leonard Katzman.

For the fourth consecutive year, the production team remains the same: Philip Capice serves as executive producer, Katzman as producer, Cliff Fenneman as associate producer, and writer Arthur Bernard Lewis as supervising producer. After two years as story editor, writer David Paulsen is now billed executive story editor.

DVD release
The eight season of Dallas' was released by Warner Bros. Home Video, on a Region 1 DVD box set of five double-sided DVDs, on February 12, 2008. In addition to the 30 episodes, it also includes the featurette "Dallas Makeover: Travilla Style".

Episodes

References

General references

External links 

1984 American television seasons
1985 American television seasons
Television shows set in New Braunfels, Texas
Dallas (1978 TV series) seasons